Danilo Kalafatović (27 October 1875 – 1946) was a Serbian military officer and Army general (Kingdom of Yugoslavia) who served in the armies of the Kingdom of Serbia (Royal Serbian Army) and Kingdom of Yugoslavia (Royal Yugoslav Army) during the first half of the 20th century. During the Second World War, he was briefly Chief of the General Staff and Supreme Commander of Yugoslavia.

Biography
Kalafatović was born on 27 October 1875 in Konarevo. At the end of World War I, Kalafatović became head of the operational section of the Serbian general staff.

During the Axis invasion of Yugoslavia, on 13 April 1941 General Kalafatović was named Chief of the General Staff of the Royal Yugoslav Army by King Peter II, succeeding General Dušan Simović, who was also serving as Prime Minister. Following the defeat of the Kingdom of Yugoslavia, Kalafatović designated Foreign Minister Aleksandar Cincar-Marković and General Radivoje Janković to sign the unconditional surrender of the country to the Axis powers.

He died in 1946 in Moosburg an der Isar, Allied-occupied Germany. His military archive is located in Toronto.

References

Sources

 
 
 

1875 births
1946 deaths
People from Kraljevo
People from the Principality of Serbia
Serbian soldiers
Royal Yugoslav Army personnel of World War II
World War II prisoners of war held by Germany
Serbian military personnel of World War I
Serbian military personnel of the Balkan Wars
Royal Serbian Army soldiers
Date of death missing
Army general (Kingdom of Yugoslavia)